Natasha Tsukanova (born 4 February 1967) is a businesswoman and philanthropist. She is best known as founder of XENON Capital Partners and co-founding the Tsukanov Family Foundation.

Early life and education
Tsukanova was born in Moscow, Russia in 1967. She holds a degree in economics from Moscow State University and was awarded a scholarship at Harvard and completed an MBA degree with Honors at INSEAD.

Career
Natasha Tsukanova started her career in 1992 working in a group of economic advisors supported by Harvard University on the privatisation reforms in Russia, and subsequently at the Boston Consulting Group in London and Moscow.

In 1997, Tsukanova joined J.P. Morgan's energy team in London and in 2005 she was appointed Head of Investment Banking in the former Soviet CIS region, including in Russia, Ukraine and the Central Asian states. During this time, J.P. Morgan achieved a foremost position in the region in terms of M&A deals.

In 2007 Tsukanova was involved in structuring several emerging markets transactions, including advising on IPOs of regional companies, such as Rosneft and Sberbank. Her team worked on restructuring of the electric power industry and the privatisation of RAO UES.

In 2009, Tsukanova founded advisory firm XENON Capital Partners, which originally specialised in the power and energy sectors. The company has acted as a financial adviser for clients on strategic M&A transactions, capital raising and investment initiatives.

In 2012, with Tsukanova as its Managing Director XENON, created an international consortium of private equity investors to acquire a 26.43% stake in power producer OJSC ENEL OGK-5. The sale of 26.4% of Enel OGK-5, a utility controlled by Italy's Enel SpA, to a group of four investors.

In 2014 Tsukanova advised on the acquisition of a 50% stake in the Etinde oil and gas concession in Cameroon by a consortium of LUKOIL and New Age. In 2016, XENON was named in Vedomosti as one of the top three financial advisers by deal value with the sale of a 40% stake in Irkutskenergo for $1bn. XENON consulted Eurasia Drilling Co (EDC) and its core shareholders when Schlumberger NV made an offer to purchase a 51% stake in the company in 2017.

Tsukanova is on the advisory board of fund manager Kerogen Capital, an Asia-based $2bn energy private equity fund.

During 2022, with Tsukanova as managing director, Xenon Capital served as a financial advisor to the Global Fashion Group (GFG).

Philanthropy
In 2021, Tsukanova helped launch ballet NFTs with the ballerina Natalia Osipova, a Principal of The Royal Ballet in London. The NFTs featuring three video performances by Osipova were offered at Bonhams auction house in London.

Natasha, Together with her husband Igor Tsukanov founded the Tsukanov Family Foundation (TFF), which supports projects in the arts, culture and education. Among its significant projects are collaborations with the Saatchi Gallery, the provision of scholarships at British schools, and support of productions at the Royal Opera House.

The Tsukanov Foundation also supports various programmes in the field of art education, including at the Yale School of Art (USA), Goldsmiths (UK) and the Institute of Contemporary Art (ICA, Russia). The TFF owns collections of post-war Soviet art and has donated important pieces to international museums.

For six years, Natasha served on the board of directors of the London Philharmonic Orchestra. She was appointed Chair of the International Board of Governors of the London Philharmonic Orchestra in 2018. She also served on the Development Committee and Board of Honorary Directors of the Royal Opera House.

Awards and recognition
In 1996, Tsukanova was the recipient of the Edward A. Hewitt Prize by the American Association for the Advancement of Slavic Studies. The award was presented due to her article on "Competition Policy in Russia During and After Privatization".

Personal life
Tsukanova is married to art collector Igor Tsukanov. She lives in London with her husband and children.

References

1967 births
20th-century businesswomen
20th-century philanthropists
21st-century businesswomen
21st-century philanthropists
Businesspeople from London
Businesspeople from Moscow
Chairpersons of organizations
Chairwomen
Financial company founders
Founders of charities
Harvard University alumni
INSEAD alumni
Living people
Moscow State University alumni
Patrons of the arts
Patrons of schools
Philanthropists from London
Royal Opera House
Women bankers
Women company founders
Women corporate directors
Women philanthropists